Kamp or KAMP may refer to:


Geography
 Kamp (river), Austria
 Kamp (Bad Doberan), a park in the German town of Bad Doberan
 Kamp, a district of the German municipality Kamp-Bornhofen
 Kamp, a district of the German municipality Kamp-Lintfort
 Kamp Mound Site, Illinois, United States

American radio stations
 KAMP-LP, a low-power radio station licensed to St. Michael, Alaska
 KAMP (University of Arizona), a student-run radio station in Tucson, Arizona
 KNX-FM, a radio station licensed to Los Angeles, California, formerly KAMP (2009) and KAMP-FM (2009–2021)
 KAMP (AM), a sports radio station licensed to Aurora, Colorado, and serving the Denver metropolitan area

Other uses
 Kamp (surname)
 Hotel Kämp, Helsinki, Finland
 Kamp Store, Kampsville, Illinois, United States, on the National Register of Historic Places
 Kutaisi Auto Mechanical Plant (KAMP), Kutaisi, Georgia